The Guadeloupe raccoon (Procyon lotor minor) is a common raccoon subspecies endemic to the two main islands (Basse-Terre Island and Grande-Terre) of Guadeloupe in the Lesser Antilles.

Classification 

Though thought in the past to be a distinct species, the Guadeloupe raccoon is a subspecies of the common raccoon (Procyon lotor), according to two studies in 1999 and 2003. The study of its morphological and genetic traits done in 2003 by Kristofer M. Helgen and Don E. Wilson indicated that the Guadeloupe raccoon was introduced by humans just a few centuries ago. This assumption is supported by the fact that the Guadeloupe raccoon seems to be closely related to the Bahamian raccoon (Procyon lotor maynardi), which is endemic on New Providence Island in the Bahamas, an archipelago nearly 2,000 km (1,243 mi) away, and that evidence exists of former raccoon populations on Cuba, Hispaniola, and Jamaica. Therefore, the Guadeloupe raccoon is listed to be conspecific with the Bahaman raccoon in the third edition of Mammal Species of the World and its former scientific name Procyon (lotor) minor is listed as a synonym for Procyon lotor maynardi.  According to Pons’ haplotype comparisons done by his study, the genetic distance between the lotor subspecies and P. l. minor was shorter than between P. l. hirtus, pallidus and lotor. Raccoons of Arizona are the most divergent, as they are from separate branches, whereas Guadeloupe raccoons are most similar to raccoons from Virginia and Maryland.

Description 

Compared to an average sized raccoon, the Guadeloupe raccoon is small with a delicate skull, making it an example of insular dwarfism. The coat is dark gray, with a slight ocher tint on the neck and shoulders. On the underparts, only a few guard hairs cover the light brown ground hairs.

Conservation 
In 1996, the Guadeloupe raccoon was classified as endangered by the IUCN because its population number of less than 2,500 mature individuals has continued to decline. Considering its small range, the Guadeloupe raccoon was most likely never numerous, just as the four other island raccoons: the (Cozumel raccoon, Tres Marias raccoon, Bahamian raccoon and the extinct Barbados raccoon).

The Guadeloupe raccoon suffers from the destruction of its habitat, mangrove forests and the rainforest, on Guadeloupe. Furthermore, it is threatened by the reported introduction of the crab-eating raccoon. The Guadeloupe raccoon has been chosen as emblematic species for the Guadeloupe National Park, but it may face extinction without additional conservation efforts.

On the other hand, Helgen and Wilson are of the opinion that the Guadeloupe raccoon itself could be considered to be an invasive species which poses a threat to the insular ecosystem.

References 

Mammals of Guadeloupe
Endemic fauna of Guadeloupe
Mammals of the Caribbean
Procyonidae

fr:Procyon minor